Edward Neville Seymour (14 January 1906 – 12 February 1980) was an Irish first-class cricketer.

Seymour was born at Dublin in January 1906, and was educated in the city at the Masonic Boys' School. Playing his club cricket for Clontarf, Seymour made his debut in first-class cricket for Ireland against Scotland at Dublin in 1927. He made two further first-class appearances in 1928, against the touring West Indians at Dublin, and Scotland at Edinburgh. In the 1928 match against Scotland, he was no-balled for throwing, and did not play for Ireland again. Playing as a fast-medium bowler, he took four wickets in his three first-class matches, with best figures of 2/26. Outside of cricket, he worked for Gouldings' Fertilisers. He died at Dublin in December 1980.

References

External links

1906 births
1980 deaths
Cricketers from Dublin (city)
Irish cricketers
People educated at Masonic Boys School, Dublin